= Bibliomania (manga) =

Japanese web manga

BIBLIOMANIA (ビブリオマニア) is a Japanese one-shot web manga written by Orval (おおばる) and illustrated by Macchiro (マッチロ). It was serialized on the pop culture site KAI-YOU.net from 2016 to 2018 and later published in print and digital formats in Japanese, French, German, and Spanish. The work is a re-imagining of Lewis Carroll’s Alice's Adventures in Wonderland and centers on a girl named Alice who attempts to escape a mysterious, cursed manor where her body progressively rots as she moves further from her room.

== Plot ==
A young girl named Alice awakens in Room 431 of a strange manor whose host is a talking serpent. The serpent tells her that any wish or desire will be granted as long as she remains in her room, but if she leaves, her body will begin to rot, and the further she goes, the worse the decay will become. The only way to exit the manor is to pass through all the other rooms and reach Room 000.

Ignoring the warning, Alice sets out through the manor's countless rooms, each inhabited by bizarre guests who have succumbed to their own desires and been warped into monstrous forms. As she advances, her body gradually decays, while the narrative reveals through flashbacks and encounters how the outside world fell into ruin and how Alice herself came to be trapped in the manor.

The story is structured as a slow, dreamlike journey through a decaying, book-like world, blending body horror, surreal imagery, and a mystery about the nature of the manor and Alice's identity. It has been compared to a dark, post-apocalyptic retelling of Alice's Adventures in Wonderland, with themes of desire, escapism, and the denial of reality.

== Creation and development ==
Orval (おおばる) is an art director and character designer from Japan. Prior to BIBLIOMANIA, he worked on character design and lyrics for the TV anime Otoppe and web animation Mirai Kōshin Harima Sakura, among other projects.

Macchiro (マッチロ) is an illustrator and manga artist, born in 1985, who worked as a designer before becoming a freelance illustrator in 2013, with a strong influence from bande dessinée (Franco-Belgian comics). The collaboration between Orval (script) and Macchiro (art) was first presented as a long-form web manga on KAI-YOU.net.

The manga was initially self-published as a doujin work and later distributed digitally via Manga Hack Perry (a digital publishing service associated with the Manga Hack platform).

== Publication ==
=== Web serialization ===
BIBLIOMANIA was serialized on the Japanese pop culture portal KAI-YOU.net from September 5, 2016, to April 16, 2018, comprising 12 chapters. The site marketed it as a “long-form manga” (長編漫画) with a dark fantasy and science fiction take on Alice's Adventures in Wonderland.

During its serialization, BIBLIOMANIA recorded access rankings topping the KAI-YOU.net chart and was later nominated in the “Web Manga General Election 2017”.

=== Japanese editions ===
- A digital edition was released via Manga Hack Perry and other ebook stores (Kindle, BookLive, Rakuten Kobo, honto, Kinokuniya, etc.).
- A Japanese digital volume is distributed by Crossfolio Publishing under the BLIC label; Cmoa lists it as a 331-page, 1‑volume work labeled “1巻完結” (volume 1, complete).
- A print edition in Japanese has been sold as a doujin/self-published work; some sources and listings treat the 330‑page Master Edition as the primary tankōbon release.

=== International editions ===
- French edition: A 330‑page one-shot titled Bibliomania was published by Mangetsu in March 2023, released both as a hardcover and an ebook. The French edition is described as a one-shot blending dark fantasy and science fiction, published under the Manga Hack / Mangetsu label.
- German edition: A “Master Edition” hardcover with 330 pages is listed by German retailers, also classified as a one-shot.
- Spanish edition: A Spanish-language edition is distributed by KIBOOK EDICIONES; in 2023, publisher Echoes announced that the Spanish release went into multiple printings, indicating strong overseas demand for the indie web manga.

=== Recognition ===
At the 22nd Japan Media Arts Festival (2019), BIBLIOMANIA was selected as a Jury Selection (審査委員会推薦作品) in the Manga division, with the jury praising its reconstruction of Alice's Adventures in Wonderland as an original dark fantasy and highlighting the dense, expressive artwork and the strong sense of mystery driving the narrative.
